In Mormonism, the sealing power is the means whereby all "covenants, contracts, bonds, obligations, oaths, vows, performances, connections, associations, or expectations" attain "efficacy, virtue, or force in and after the resurrection from the dead."

New Testament references
Christ refers to this power in  when he says to Peter: "And I will give thee the keys of the kingdom of heaven: and whatsoever thou shalt bind on earth shall be bound in heaven: and whatsoever thou shalt loose on earth shall be loosed in heaven."

This is later repeated in : "Verily I say unto you, Whatsoever ye shall bind on earth shall be bound in heaven: and whatsoever ye shall loose on earth shall be loosed in heaven."

Restoration
This power is believed to have been held in Old Testament times by the prophet Elijah, and that he restored this power to Joseph Smith in the Kirtland Temple of the Church of the Latter Day Saints on April 3, 1836 in fulfillment of an Old Testament prophecy in : "Behold, I will send you Elijah the prophet before the coming of the great and dreadful day of the LORD: and he shall turn the heart of the fathers to the children, and the heart of the children to the fathers, lest I come and smite the earth with a curse."

Marriage

An ordinance where the sealing power is clearly displayed is in marriage. A typical marriage ceremony includes the caveat "until death do you part", whereas marriages performed with the sealing power in a temple can exist beyond death and into heaven. These marriages are referred to as celestial marriages, and are for eternity, not just until death. In this instance, husbands and wives are referred to as being sealed to one another, and the children are sealed to their parents, making an "eternal family."

Detailed explanation

The sealing power is explained in greater detail in D&C 132:7-19:

Boyd K. Packer has also elaborated on the meaning of the term "seal" in conjunction with the phrase "sealing power":

See also
 Priesthood (Latter Day Saints)
 Second anointing

References

Latter Day Saint ordinances, rituals, and symbolism
Latter Day Saint terms
1836 establishments in the United States
1836 in Christianity
Latter Day Saint belief and doctrine